The 2020–21 Biathlon World Cup – Stage 4 was the fourth event of the season and was held in Hochfilzen, Austria, from 17 to 20 December 2020.

Schedule of events 
The events took place at the following times.

Podiums

Men

Women

Achievements 

 Best individual performance for all time
Not include World Championships and Olympic Games

 , 2nd place in Mass Start
 , 12th place in Mass Start
 , 19th place in Pursuit
 , 20th place in Sprint
 , 55th place in Sprint
 , 61st place in Sprint
 , 99th place in Sprint
 , 107th place in Sprint
 , 108th place in Sprint
 , 10th place in Mass Start
 , 12th place in Sprint
 , 24th place in Sprint
 , 38th place in Sprint
 , 72nd place in Sprint
 , 83rd place in Sprint
 , 105th place in Sprint

 First individual World Cup race

 , 55th place in Sprint
 , 99th place in Sprint
 , 107th place in Sprint
 , 108th place in Sprint

References

Biathlon World Cup - Stage 4, 2020-21
2020–21 Biathlon World Cup
Biathlon competitions in Austria
Biathlon World Cup